The Greece national football team represents Greece in men's international football matches and is controlled by the Hellenic Football Federation, the governing body for football in Greece. Starting in 2023, Greece play their home matches in Nea Filadelfeia, a suburb of Athens, at the newly built Agia Sophia Stadium. Greece is one of only ten national teams to have been crowned UEFA European Champions.

Greece had a small presence in international football. From the 1980s they have experienced the first taste of, but not a banquet, of football achievement. Their first appearance in a major tournament was at UEFA Euro 1980. They never made it through the group stage. Their qualification to the then eight-team UEFA European Championship gave them a position in the top eight European football nations that year. Greece did not qualify for another major tournament until the 1994 FIFA World Cup and after an undefeated qualifying campaign, they produced a poor performance in the finals, losing all three group matches without scoring.

UEFA Euro 2004 marked the highest point in Greece's football history when they won the tournament in only their second participation. Dismissed as rank outsiders before the tournament, Greece defeated some of the favourites in the competition including defending European champions France and hosts Portugal. During the tournament, Greece defeated the hosts in both the opening game of the tournaments and again in the final. Their triumph earned them a place in the 2005 FIFA Confederations Cup.

In the decade after the 2004 victory, Greece qualified for the finals tournaments of all but one major competition entered, reaching the quarter-finals at the UEFA Euro 2012 and the round of 16 at the 2014 FIFA World Cup. During that period, they occupied a place in the top 20 of the FIFA World Rankings for all but four months, and reached an all-time high of eighth in the world from April to June 2008, as well as in October 2011.

History

First years
On 12 April 1896, a Greek XI represented by Podilatikos Syllogos Athinon lost to a Denmark XI by either 9–0 or 15–0, at the Neo Phaliron Velodrome in Athens in a demonstration game during the 1896 Olympic Games.

The first three editions of the Olympic football event (1900–06) had an unofficial status, as the event was not yet open for national football teams to compete, and only had limited participation of three or four club teams from a few nations. Greece had no club team invited in the 1900 Olympics and the 1904 Olympics, but then hosted the 1906 Olympics, competing against a Danish club team again (DBU Copenhagen) and two club teams from the Ottoman Empire (Smyrna and Thessaloniki). The team to represent Greece compiled of players from Athens, hence the Athens City selection, and in the final they conceded 9 goals from the Denmark XI in the first half alone, and thereby they withdrew from the final at half time, and were then invited to a play-off in a match to decide the second place, but Athens declined and were promptly ejected from the tournament.

Greece had to wait 13 years for their next (unofficial) appearance when they participated in the Inter-Allied Games in Paris in 1919, following the end of World War I, and once again it was a disaster as the team conceded twenty goals without reply in their first two games, although this time with a silver lining since Greece managed to beat Romania in their third and final match with a dramatic 3–2 win. In the following year, Greece participated in the 1920 Summer Games of Antwerp, being knocked out in the first round by Sweden with yet another heavy defeat (9–0). This match is recognized as their first official match by FIFA. Notable figures during these years was Giorgos Kalafatis, player and later manager of the team, and Giannis Andrianopoulos.

The Greece national team's first official match came on 7 April 1929 in a 1–4 loss to Italy B, with Alvertos Nahmias being the author of the nation's first-ever official goal.

1930s Balkan Cups
Between 1929 and 1936, Greece participated in six Balkan Cups, with their best campaign coming in the 1934–35 Balkan Cup when they finished second just one point short of Yugoslavia. A notable figure during these years was Kostas Choumis, who scored a total of 7 goals in the Balkan Cup, being among the all-time top goal scorers in the competition's history.

1950s Mediterranean Cups
Between 1949 and 1958, Greece participated in three Mediterranean Cups, with their best campaign coming in the 1950–53 Mediterranean Cup when they finished second just one point short of Italy B. A notable figure during these years was Georgios Darivas, who was the top goal scorer of the 1950-53 edition with 4 goals, a tally that includes a hat-trick against Turkey.

In 1951, Greece also won the 1st edition of the Mediterranean Games men's football tournament, held in Alexandria, Egypt, defeating both Syria and the hosts Egypt on their way to the title. The star of the Greece team was Nikos Lekatsas, who was the top goal scorer with 4 goals, a tally that includes a hat-trick against Syria.

1970s World Cups near misses
During the next decades, Greece had passion but little international success in the sport, as the nation's economical and social situations after World War II did not allow for successful development of a national team.

At its best, Greece narrowly missed qualifying for two FIFA World Cup competitions: 1970 (despite a quality team, including some of its greatest-ever players, such as Mimis Domazos, Giorgos Sideris, Giorgos Koudas and Mimis Papaioannou), and 1978.

Euro 1980

Greece, under the guidance of Alketas Panagoulias, made its first appearance in a major tournament at the Euro 1980 in Italy, after qualifying top of a group that included the Soviet Union and Hungary, both world football powers. In the final tournament, Greece was drawn into group A with West Germany, the Netherlands, and Czechoslovakia. In their first game, Greece held the Dutch until the only goal of the game was scored with a penalty kick by Kist, in the 65th minute. Three days later Greece played Czechoslovakia in Rome. After holding the Czechoslovakians 1–1 at the end the first half, Greece eventually lost 3–1. In their last game, Greece earned a 0–0 draw against eventual winners West Germany, concluding what was considered a decent overall performance in the team's maiden presence in a final phase of any football competition.

1994 World Cup

The team's success in qualifying for the 1994 FIFA World Cup in the United States, marked the first time they had made it to the FIFA World Cup finals. Greece finished first and undefeated in their qualifying group, surpassing Russia in the final game. In the final tournament Greece were drawn into Group D with Nigeria, Bulgaria, and Argentina. After the successful qualifying campaign, expectations back in Greece were high as no one could imagine the oncoming astounding failure. Most notable reason for this complete failure was the fact that Alketas Panagoulias opted to take a squad full of those players – though most of them aging and out of form – that helped the team in the qualifying instead of new emerging talents seeing it as a reward for their unprecedented success. Furthermore, they had the disadvantage of being drawn into a "group of death", with runners-up at the 1990 FIFA World Cup Argentina, later semifinalists Bulgaria, and Nigeria, one of the strongest African teams. It is worth mentioning that all players of the squad, including the three goalkeepers, took part in those three games, something very rare. This tournament was humiliating for the Greece squad, though it was understandable given its first maiden appearance and the vast disparity of quality of opponents. In their first game against Argentina at Foxboro Stadium just outside Boston, they lost 4–0. Four days later Greece suffered another 4–0 blow from Bulgaria at Soldier Field in Chicago, and then, in what would be their final game, they lost to Nigeria 2–0 at Foxboro Stadium again. In the end, Greece were eliminated in the first round by losing all three games, scoring no goals and conceding ten.

Near misses
Greece failed to qualify for the Euro 1996 finishing third in the group behind Russia and Scotland. In their 1998 World Cup qualifying tournament the team finished only one point shy of second-placed Croatia after a 0–0 draw by the eventual Group winners, the Danish. Croatia and Denmark would make the Semi-Finals and Quarter-Finals respectively, of that World Cup. In their Euro 2000 qualifying group, Greece finished again in third place, two points behind second-placed Slovenia in a highly disappointing campaign that saw the team lose at home to Latvia. In the 2002 World Cup qualifying Greece finished a disappointing fourth in their group behind England, Germany and Finland, which led to the sacking of coach Vasilis Daniil, replaced by Otto Rehhagel. Highlights of the campaign included a 5–1 defeat in Finland and the 2–2 draw that followed in England, the first of two games the Greece national team would be under the reins of the German coach.

European Champions: Euro 2004 triumph

Qualification
Greece started the UEFA Euro 2004 qualification campaign with defeats at home to Spain and away to Ukraine, both with a 2–0 scoreline. The team went on to win their remaining six games, including a 1–0 away win over Spain in Zaragoza, securing first place in the group and an appearance in the European Championship finals for the first time in 24 years.

Before the tournament
Greece were the second-least favorite in the competition to win, with Latvia being the least favorite. Greece were also considered as outsiders and underdogs and were given odds of 150–1 of winning before the tournament. They were drawn in Group A, ending up with Portugal, Spain and Russia, a "group of death"; Portugal, hosts and favourites to win, Spain, former European champions, and Russia, who won the first-ever Euro as the Soviet Union. Very few people expected Greece to proceed to the quarter-finals, let alone win the tournament.

Group stage
In the opening match against hosts Portugal, Greece achieved a surprise 2–1 victory, receiving the nickname "pirate ship" (Το Πειρατικό) used by Greek sportscasters in reference to the floating ship used in the tournament's opening ceremony. Greece won with a 25-yard strike by Giorgos Karagounis and a penalty by Angelos Basinas. Four days later, Greece stunned Spain in front of a largely Spanish crowd with a 1–1 draw after being down 1–0 at half time. Greece fell behind from a defensive lapse, which allowed Fernando Morientes to score. However a sublime diagonal pass by playmaker Vasilis Tsiartas allowed Angelos Charisteas to score an equaliser in the second half, giving Greece hope of qualifying. In the final group match Greece fell behind 2–0 to Russia (who were already eliminated) within the first ten minutes of the game but managed to pull one back through Zisis Vryzas and thus progressed to the next round, at the expense of Spain, on goals scored. Dmitri Kirichenko had the chance to eliminate Greece in the final minutes of this match, but his stretched effort squeezed just wide.

Quarter-finals
In the quarter-finals Greece faced off with the undefeated and reigning champions France. At 65 minutes Greece took the lead. Angelos Basinas played a perfect pass to captain Thodoris Zagorakis, who flicked the ball high in the air, past veteran French defender Bixente Lizarazu, and sent a perfect cross to Angelos Charisteas for the header and goal. Greece held on to win despite a late French onslaught, with close efforts by Thierry Henry, thus knocking France out of Euro 2004 and becoming the first team ever to defeat both the hosts and defending champions in the same tournament.

Semi-finals
Greece reached the semi-finals to face the Czech Republic, who were the only team to defeat all of their opponents to that point. The Czech record included a convincing 3–2 win over the Netherlands, a 2–1 win over Germany, and a 3–0 win over Denmark in the quarter-finals. At this stage in the tournament the Czechs were favourites to take the trophy. The game began nervously for Greece, as the Czech Republic applied much pressure. Tomáš Rosický hit the bar in the opening minutes, and Jan Koller had several efforts saved by Antonis Nikopolidis. The Czechs chances were dealt a blow when influential midfielder Pavel Nedvěd left the pitch injured in the first half. After 90 minutes the game ended 0–0, despite the Czechs having most of the game's missed chances. In the final minute of the first half of extra time, a close range silver goal header by Traianos Dellas from a Vasilis Tsiartas corner ended the Czech campaign, putting Greece into the final of Euro 2004 and sending their fans into euphoria.

Final

For the first time in history the final was a repeat of the opening match, with Greece and hosts Portugal facing off in a rematch. In the 57th minute Charisteas gave Greece the lead with a header from a corner by Angelos Basinas. Portugal had much of the possession, but the Greece defence was solid and dealt with most attacks. Cristiano Ronaldo had a good chance to equalise in the dying moments, but could not apply a finish. Greece held on to win 1–0, winning the tournament, an achievement considered by many to be one of the greatest football upsets in history, if not the greatest. Greece captain Zagorakis was named the player of the tournament, having led Greece and made the most tackles in the entire tournament.

Recognition
Greece's victory shot them up in the FIFA World Rankings from 35th in June 2004 to 14th in July 2004. This is one of the largest upward moves in a single month in the top echelon of the rankings. The triumph of Greece at Euro 2004 is the biggest sporting achievement in the country's history for a team sport, along with the successes of the Greece national basketball team in the European Championships of 1987, 2005 and 2006 FIBA World Championship and the World Championship title of Greece women's national water polo team in 2011. The team has appeared on stamps and received medals from Konstantinos Stephanopoulos (the President of Greece), Archbishop Christodoulos of Athens, and an ecstatic ovation from the country's population which came out to see the team drive with the trophy from the Athens airport to the Panathenaic Stadium where the Greek political and religious leadership was awaiting them. The Euro 2004 winners were selected as "World Team of the Year" at the 2005 Laureus World Sports Award for Team of the Year.

2005 Confederations Cup
As European champions, Greece qualified for the 2005 FIFA Confederations Cup in Germany and were drawn into Group B along with 2002 FIFA World Cup champions Brazil, 2004 AFC Asian Cup champions Japan, and 2003 CONCACAF Gold Cup champions Mexico. Greece lost their first two matches 3–0 to Brazil and 1–0 to Japan before drawing 0–0 with Mexico to finish at the bottom of the group. The squad included players such as Stathis Tavlaridis, Loukas Vyntra, Michalis Sifakis, Giannis Amanatidis and Fanis Gekas, all of whom earned their first call ups or maiden caps in the national squad.

2006 World Cup qualifying
After winning the Euro 2004, Greece faced Ukraine, Turkey, Denmark, Albania, Georgia and Kazakhstan in Group 2 of the 2006 FIFA World Cup qualification tournament. Greece opened their campaign with a 2–1 loss to Albania in Tirana before draws with Turkey (0–0) and Ukraine (1–1) followed by a 3–1 victory over Kazakhstan.

In 2005, Greece resumed their campaign with three victories, defeating Denmark 2–1; Georgia 3–1; and Albania 2–0; before earning a goalless away draw with Turkey. Just prior to the 2005 FIFA Confederations Cup, Greece lost 1–0 at home to Ukraine after a late goal from Andriy Husin. Following a 2–1 away win against Kazakhstan, the team experienced a setback after a 1–0 defeat to Denmark in Copenhagen diminished their chances of qualification.

In their last game, Greece defeated Georgia, finishing in fourth place, four points behind first-placed Ukraine, two behind Turkey, and a point behind Denmark. Throughout the match, fans in the Karaiskakis Stadium chanted the name of Otto Rehhagel in their utmost support and he said afterwards "Even if 10 years pass, part of my heart will be Greek".

Euro 2008

Greece was the highest-ranked seed for the UEFA Euro 2008 qualifying tournament and was drawn with Turkey, Norway, Bosnia and Herzegovina, Hungary, Moldova and Malta.

They began their Euro 2008 qualification campaign with victories over Moldova, Norway and Bosnia and Herzegovina before suffering a 4–1 home loss against Turkey in Athens. Greece went on to win away to Malta, with the only goal coming in the 66th minute from an Angelos Basinas penalty, beat Hungary and Moldova at home and drew 2–2 away to Norway despite having hit the goalpost three times in this match. The draw in Oslo was followed by a 3–2 home win against Bosnia-Herzegovina and a 1–0 away win to Turkey, securing its presence to the Euro 2008 finals at their old rival's home ground. In the last two matches, Greece overcame Malta 5–0 in Athens and defeated Hungary with an away 2–1 win, finishing first in their group with a total of 31 points, the most points gained among any team in qualifying.

As defending European champions, Greece were top seed for the final tournament and were drawn with Sweden, Spain, and Russia in Group D.

In the tournament, Greece team lost all three games and scored only one goal. Greece underperformed in the opening match against Sweden and lost 2–0 before losing 1–0 to Russia. Having already been eliminated, Angelos Charisteas opened the scoring for Greece against Spain, but lost 2–1, becoming the first defending champion not to earn a single point in the next European Championship.

2010 World Cup
Despite the scoring prowess of Europe's top 2010 World Cup qualifying goal-scorer Fanis Gekas—who produced 10 goals in as many games—Greece took second place to Switzerland in Group 2 of UEFA qualification, thus advancing to a home-and-away playoff round, where they faced Ukraine. After a scoreless draw at home in the first match, the second leg in Donetsk saw Greece triumph with a 1–0 win, sending the Greece to the 2010 FIFA World Cup. At the 2010 World Cup draw in Cape Town, South Africa on 4 December 2009, Greece found itself grouped with two familiar opponents from its first World Cup appearance in 1994. Argentina and Nigeria were yet again drawn into group stage play alongside Greece, this time into Group B with South Korea replacing Greece's third 1994 opponent, Bulgaria.

In its World Cup opener, Greece lost 2–0 to South Korea after a dismal performance characterized by excessive long-ball attacks and a lack of offensive creativity. In the second fixture against Nigeria, Greece won 2–1, coming from behind after conceding an early goal. Dimitris Salpingidis scored Greece's first-ever goal in the World Cup finals in the 44th minute of the first half to tie the match at 1–1. Vasilis Torosidis scored the winning goal in the 71st minute, securing the first points and first victory for Greece in tournament history. In the third match against heavily favoured Argentina, Greece needed a combination of results to advance to the next round. As expected, in what would be his final game as Greece's national team head coach, Otto Rehhagel conjured up a very defensive-minded strategy, leaving Georgios Samaras with nearly all offensive responsibilities as the lone striker. The strategy nearly paid off in the second half with the score still locked at 0–0 when Samaras beat the last Argentine defender on a quick long-ball counter-attack but curled a rushed shot just wide of the far post. Greece held Argentina scoreless until the 77th minute but ultimately lost 2–0, finishing third in Group B.

Greece moved from 13th to 12th in the FIFA World Rankings following the tournament. Russia, Croatia and France dropped lower than Greece while Uruguay and Chile jumped ahead of

Twenty-four hours removed from Greece's World Cup loss to Argentina, Otto Rehhagel stepped away from his post as Greece national team manager. Eight days later a new era in Greece football was ushered in as the Hellenic Football Federation named former AEK Athens and PAOK boss Fernando Santos the new manager. Under Santos the Greece immediately went to work on an unprecedented streak of success, setting a senior-club record by going unbeaten in Santos' first seventeen matches as manager. While Greece's proficiency in stifling opposition attacks seemed to wane toward the end of Rehhagel's tenure, the emergence of Santos seemed to galvanize Greece defending once more. Through seven international friendlies and ten Euro 2012 qualifiers, Greece kept nine clean sheets and conceded just one goal in each of the remaining eight contests. From start to end of their unbeaten run, Santos' national side moved from No. 12 to No. 8 in FIFA's world rankings, equaling the highest mark in history credited by FIFA to Greece. Only one match from their streak featured a team (other than Greece) that appeared at the 2010 World Cup, a 1–0 defeat of Serbia in Belgrade.

Euro 2012

Qualifying
With its late-game comeback victory over Georgia in October 2011, Greece padded its historic football tournament résumé, most importantly by sealing an automatic berth into UEFA's 2012 European Football Championship tournament. For the second time in team history the national side won its qualifying group for a major football tournament without a single loss incurred, as Greece also went undefeated in 1994 World Cup qualifiers. Adding to its 1980, 2004 and 2008 Euro qualifying campaigns, the Georgia triumph marked the fifth time overall that Greece has won its qualification group for a major tournament. Although their tendency to produce positive results remained steady throughout qualifying, so too did the Greece proclivity to start games slowly and concede early goals. This habit would plague Greece through qualifying and eventually tarnish their Euro 2012 performances.

Over two qualifying contests, Greece trailed Georgia on the scoreboard for 130 of 180 minutes and still managed to grab four of six possible points in the standings by way of three late strikes. Goals scored in the dying minutes of games, often coming from defenders, became somewhat of a Greek signature on Group F's table. In fact Greece was able to take and keep a first-half lead just once in ten games, the 3–1 home defeat of Malta which was ranked 50th of 53 teams in Europe. In Malta, a last-second tie-breaking strike from defender Vasilis Torosidis pocketed a crucial extra two points in the standings for Greece, the same number of points it held over Croatia at the end of qualifying. Despite allowing weaker teams in the group to bring the game to them, Greece admirably held powerful Croatia scoreless through two meetings and deservedly won Group F four days after a decisive 2–0 home win versus the second-place Croats. Fanis Gekas, who retired from national team service in 2010 after Fernando Santos' third game as manager, came out of retirement in time to contribute a goal to the result. Gekas was eventually included in Santos's 23-man Euro 2012 roster, leaving out Euro 2004 hero Angelos Charisteas who scored the group-clinching goal in the aforementioned Greece qualifying victory in Georgia.

Group stage in Poland

"Shades of 2004" was a commonly perceived theme regarding the buildup to Euro 2012 for Greece and their progression through the tournament. As in 2004 Greece was drawn into the same group as the host nation, Poland on this occasion, and also had the pressure of playing in the tournament's opening match. Two familiar foes from its 2004 championship run, Russia and Czech Republic, joined Greece and Poland in Group A on 2 December 2011 at the tournament's final draw in Kiev. Upon drawing the lowest-ranked teams from Pots 1 and 2 as well as the second-lowest from Pot 4, Greece's prospects of passing the group stage at Euro 2012 were given a boost.

Ideas of steering "To Piratiko" to a dream start in host-nation territory as Greece did in Portugal eight years before, rapidly turned sour during the opening match's first half. From the outset Greece appeared uncomfortable holding the ball for long spells and seemed content to allow hosts Poland to push numbers forward with the ball, hoping to score through counter-attacks. However, Poland made the most of its early possession, as top scorer Robert Lewandowski converted a header from a goal line cross past a scurrying Kostas Chalkias. Hope and momentum continued to tip in favor of Poland when Sokratis Papastathopoulos received his second yellow card of the game in just the 44th minute from Spanish referee Carlos Velasco Carballo. Greece began to boss the game after halftime while playing down a man. Dimitris Salpingidis made the greatest impact on the game for Greece as a second-half substitute, making brilliant penetrating runs behind the Polish defense, eventually bringing the game level 1–1 on a mistake by Poland keeper Wojciech Szczęsny. Salpingidis was then responsible for levelling up the numbers for Greece when Szczęsny made a red-card foul on Salpingidis' breakaway attempt on goal in the 68th minute. But Greece captain Giorgos Karagounis' subsequent penalty kick was turned away by substitute keeper Przemysław Tytoń. A second goal by Salpingidis was disallowed as he was assisted by an offside Kostas Fortounis, denying Greece's best opportunity to take three points from what ended as an improbable 1–1 draw.

The Czech Republic exploited Greece's weakness at the left-defender position early in the second group stage match, notching two goals in the first six minutes. Just as Poland had, the Czechs repeatedly penetrated Greece back line behind left-side defender José Cholevas, scoring on a through-ball and a cross from Cholevas' side. Petr Čech's gaffe on a Georgios Samaras cross in the second half turned into a gift goal for Fanis Gekas. The Czechs then eased off on their early pressure, opting to sit back and guard their lead for much of the second half, but Gekas' goal was too little too late. Greece lost the match 2–1, placing them at the foot of Group A in need of a victory over the attack-minded Russians to advance to the knockout rounds.

After thrashing the Czech Republic 4–1 and displaying more offensive potency in a 1–1 draw with Poland, the Russians were favored to earn the one point they needed to advance against the Greeks, especially since defeating the team in both of the previous two European Championships. However, Greece delivered a trademark 1–0 defensive victory and advanced to the Euro 2012 quarterfinals. Greece scored when Russia defender Sergei Ignashevich errantly headed a Greece throw-in behind the Russian defense for Giorgos Karagounis to pounce on. Greece's captain sprinted in on goal and struck the ball at the back post under keeper Vyacheslav Malafeev in first-half stoppage time to send the Russians reeling into the locker rooms. Ignashevich appeared to have conceded an additional golden scoring opportunity for Greece upon tripping Karagounis in the Russian penalty area early in the second half, but referee Jonas Eriksson instead booked Karagounis for what he believed to be simulation. This being Karagounis' second yellow card of the tournament, Greece was to be without its suspended captain in the next round. With that victory, Greece qualified to the quarterfinals for a second time after their successful Euro 2004 campaign.

Quarter-finals

In the quarter-finals, Greece met with a Germany side that won all three of its group matches against Portugal, Denmark and the Netherlands. Greece applied very little pressure in the midfield in the opening period, slowing the tempo of the game and affording Germany the majority of possession. Young Sotiris Ninis switched off momentarily in defence, allowing German captain Philipp Lahm to cut infield and open the scoring with a long-distance strike. Greece remained calm as in Georgios Samaras they carried a constant threat. On the counter-attack, they pulled level early in the second half; regaining possession in their defensive third, Giorgos Fotakis found Dimitris Salpingidis streaking 40 yards deep into German territory. Salpingidis delivered a ball five yards in front of goalkeeper Manuel Neuer, which Samaras was able to meet and power underneath Neuer for the equalizer. Twenty minutes later, however, the Germans led 4–1. Greece scored an 89th-minute penalty kick by Salpingidis, but the match ended 4–2 to the Germans, ending Greece's Euro 2012 campaign.

2014 World Cup

Qualifying

To reach the 2014 World Cup in Brazil, Greece had to contend with a team on the rise in Bosnia and Herzegovina and a dangerous Slovakian side seemingly in decline since its memorable 2010 World Cup qualifying and finals performances. Latvia, a familiar qualification foe for Greece in its previous two major tournaments (2010 World Cup, Euro 2012), joined the fray as well. Ahead of those aforesaid tournaments, Bosnia twice narrowly missed out on its first major international tournament appearance due to consecutive playoff defeats at the hands of Portugal. No playoff would be necessary for Bosnia in 2013, as it won its qualifying group over Greece on goal difference. The decisive match was in Bosnia on 22 March, when Greece succumbed to three set-piece goals (two free-kick headers and one penalty miss rebound) in a 3–1 defeat. Greece's defense proved rigid throughout qualifying, conceding zero goals in open play. Four goals were allowed by Greece in ten games, the first of which was a penalty by Latvia, and yet four goals were too many for a relatively unproductive Grece attack to overcome. Though Greece was shut out just once, the team only managed to score 12 goals, an output Bosnia reached in its second game.

Following group play Romania, which claimed second place over Hungary and Turkey in a group dominated by the Dutch, awaited Greece in a two-legged playoff. The last time the two sides met in late 2011, Romania came into Greece and dealt Fernando Santos his first defeat as Greece manager in his 18th game at the helm. Greece reversed the prior 3–1 result in their favour this time, scoring each goal through skillful one-touch passing and finishing. Kostas Mitroglou accounted for three of Greece's four goals in a 4–2 aggregate playoff victory, though none were actual game-winners. Dimitris Salpingidis notched the game winner in Athens, while the second leg finished 1–1 in Bucharest.

Finals

Aracaju was chosen as the team's base camp for the tournament in Brazil. Greece was drawn into Group C with Colombia, Côte d'Ivoire and Japan and ultimately created an extraordinarily similar tournament experience as it did two years prior at Euro 2012. Greece conceded an early goal in their first game against Colombia, but Panagiotis Kone narrowly missed equalizing just one minute after Colombia's fifth-minute goal. Trailing 2–0 in the 63rd minute, Fanis Gekas' header from six yards struck the crossbar for Greece's best chance of the match. The Colombians proved to be the more clinical finishers, prevailing 3–0 despite an even number of shots for both teams and a slight possession advantage in Greece's favor. To stave off the threat of elimination, the Greece needed to earn at least a point in their second match with Japan, who sat alongside them at the bottom of Group C. The task grew more difficult once captain Kostas Katsouranis received two yellow cards, reducing Greece to ten men in the 38th minute. Greece held out for a 0–0 draw and remained tied with Japan on points. The draw made it necessary for Greece to defeat Ivory Coast in their final group match in order to reach the round of 16 for the first time in their history. An early injury to midfielder Panagiotis Kone brought on young Olympiacos midfielder Andreas Samaris, who would score his first international goal after intercepting a poor back-pass by an Ivorian defender. Swansea City striker Wilfried Bony equalized for Ivory Coast in the 73rd minute. In the first minute of stoppage time, Ivory Coast striker Giovanni Sio obstructed a Samaras shot by clipping him from behind in the Ivorian penalty area, resulting in a Greece penalty kick which Samaras converted with 30 seconds remaining in the game, prompting wild celebrations in Greece.

As Group C runners-up Greece was paired in the round of 16 with Group D shock winners Costa Rica, who won their first-ever World Cup group stage ahead of former world champions Uruguay, Italy and England. Trailing 1–0 but handed an advantage by the dismissal of Costa Rican Óscar Duarte, Greece forced extra time through a Sokratis Papastathopoulos equalizer ten seconds into stoppage time. This was the only goal that Costa Rica goalkeeper Keylor Navas conceded in open play throughout the tournament. Navas thwarted several opportunities for Greece throughout the 30 minutes of extra time and saved Fanis Gekas' penalty in the game's concluding penalty shootout. Costa Rica claimed its first World Cup knockout stage victory and denied Greece its first by defeating Greece 5–3 on penalties.

Post Brazil 2014

Euro 2016 qualifying: Reorganization and decline

The team appointed Claudio Ranieri as head coach in July 2014. He was sacked in November of the same year after a shocking home defeat to the Faroe Islands. Sergio Markarián was appointed in his place, but he too has come under fire, after the team's terrible performances in the remaining UEFA Euro 2016 qualifying. The team's form after September 2014 proved to be abysmal, with no wins in over a year. Greece finished in bottom place in their Euro Qualifying group, earning just one victory against Hungary in the final round, and failing to qualify for the tournament. Greece, along with the Netherlands and Bosnia and Herzegovina were the only nations from Pot 1 not to qualify for the finals. Those three had taken part in the 2014 FIFA World Cup. Incidentally, the three teams would also fail to qualify for the World Cup in 2018.

2018 World Cup qualifying: Resurgence

In attempting to qualify for the 2018 FIFA World Cup, Greece would suffer a second successive failure to reach a major tournament, despite improvements and some positive results. They finished second in Group H of the European qualifying stages, nine points behind runaway leaders Belgium and two points clear of third placed Bosnia and Herzegovina. Greece were subsequently drawn against Croatia in the play-off round, where they were knocked out over two legs; a 4–1 away defeat set the tone for Greece's campaign, and in the second leg they drew a blank in a 0–0 stalemate against the Croats to signify the end of their World Cup hopes.

2018–19 Nations League and Euro 2020 qualifying: Inconsistency, fall and promising finish

Greece had to start their UEFA Nations League in League C due to previously poor performance. Greece won and lost three games each to these opponents altogether, and only finished third in the Nations League and was unable to promote to League B when the UEFA revised the format.

Greece's qualification campaign for UEFA Euro 2020 commenced with the team being placed in Group J. Due to disappointing results, John van 't Schip decided not to call-up some of the leading members of the squad, such as Sokratis Papastathopoulos and Kostas Manolas for their final matches. A more youthful Greek showed a massive improvement in their attacking and pressing style of play. In the final three games Greece achieved successive victories. Greece finished third in the final table but this was still not enough to earn a play-off spot.

2020–21 Nations League and 2022 World Cup Qualifying

Having been forced to remain in League C due to poor performance, Greece had to start its campaign on their quest to be promoted. Greece needed a win in the last game against Slovenia at home to achieve promotion to League B. The match ended on 0-0, with Greece failing to promote a second consecutive time, despite being unbeaten and having conceded just one goal.

Greece was put in Group B for the 2022 FIFA World Cup qualifiers. The campaign started with an upset away 1–1 draw against group favourites Spain, but was followed by two 1-1 draws to Georgia at home and Kosovo away. A 2–1 home win over Sweden kept the hopes for qualification alive, and was followed by a 2–0 away win against Georgia. At the crucial away match in Stockholm, Greece made a good performance in the first half but eventually lost 2–0 to Sweden. Another loss, 1–0 at home to group winners Spain ratified Greece's elimination from the finals, with Greece failing to qualify for a World Cup for the second consecutive time.

2022–23 UEFA Nations League
Under the instructions of manager Gus Poyet, Greece had a successful run in the Group C2 of the 2022–23 competition. The Galanolefki secured promotion to League B by topping the group ahead of Kosovo, Northern Ireland and Cyprus.

Home stadium

Traditionally, Greece have spent most of their history playing their home matches in different stadiums primarily in or near Athens, but also in a number of other cities around the country. The home ground of the national team was the Karaiskakis Stadium in Piraeus, since its reconstruction in 2004 until 2017.

Since their first international fixture in 1929 and for the next 33 years, Greece regularly used Apostolos Nikolaidis Stadium as their home ground. Their first home match away from it was played at the Nikos Goumas Stadium in 1962, while the Karaiskakis Stadium was used for the first time in 1964, when it was renovated. In 1966, Kaftanzoglio Stadium in Thessaloniki became the first stadium outside of the Athens area to be used. Since then all of these stadiums were alternately used until the early 1980s, while a few other stadiums were inaugurated by the national team as well such as Thessaloniki's Toumba Stadium and Harilaou Stadium in 1975 and 1977 respectively. Greece also held matches at other home grounds outside of the two major cities in 1976, such as Panachaiki Stadium in Patras and Kavala Stadium in Kavala. In 1982, Georgios Kamaras Stadium was added to the list of home grounds for the national team, the first in Athens out of the three major stadiums.

On 16 November 1983, the newly built Athens Olympic Stadium, to date the largest stadium in the country, housed the national team for the first time in a qualifier for UEFA Euro 1984 against Denmark. It served as the primary home ground for the team for the rest of the 1980s and the 1990s, until 2001 when it was closed for renovations. Meanwhile, a large number of matches were held in various stadiums including old choices and some new in provincial cities all over the country, something that did not change until the early 2000s, when the Athens Olympic Stadium was almost abandoned. From the start of the 2000 until the qualifiers games of Euro 2004, the Greek National Team uses Leoforos Stadium as its home. Since 2004 Greece has mainly used Karaiskakis Stadium, with very few of Greece's matches being played in other stadiums. They returned to OAKA in 2018 for a friendly against Switzerland and announced they would play their home matches for the new UEFA Nations League there, as well. For the UEFA Euro 2020 qualifiers, they were slated to split time between OAKA in Athens, and the Pankritio Stadium in Heraklion on the island of Crete, but with the latter requiring upgrades to be fit for FIFA standards, the entire campaign was held in Athens.

On 7 March 2023, it was announced that the new Agia Sophia Stadium in the Nea Filadelfeia section of Athens would become the new home of the Ethniki.

Team image

Greece's traditional colours are blue and white, originating from the Greece flag. Although blue was used as the home kit since the team's inception, white became the primary home color following UEFA Euro 2004. In recent decades, Greece wear either a set of white jerseys, shorts and socks, or an all-blue combination. Formerly, the kit consisted of a combination of blue jerseys and white shorts and vice versa. Meanwhile, Greece's kit has occasionally featured stripes, crosses or other designs, as well as various values of blue.

On 10 April 2013, the Hellenic Football Federation announced a partnership with American manufacturer Nike, which is Greece's current official supplier, with their first kit debuting on 7 June 2013 in the away match to Lithuania. On 4 March 2014, Greece unveiled their latest kit also worn at the 2014 FIFA World Cup.

The crest (εθνόσημο means "national sign"), which is used in the kit, is the official emblem of the national team.

Kit sponsorship

Nicknames

Traditionally, Greece is referred to by the media and the Greeks in general simply as Ethniki (Εθνική) in Greek, which literally means 'National'. The team is often called Galanolefki (Sky blue-white) due to the use of the colours of the Greece flag as kit colours. Both nicknames are used for the country's national teams in other sports as well.

During the opening ceremony at the UEFA Euro 2004, which took place right before the inaugural game of the tournament between Greece and hosts Portugal, a replica of a 16th-century ship was used referring to the expeditions of the Portuguese explorers of that time. Greek radio sports journalist Georgios Helakis, while broadcasting the opening match, commented that "since the Portuguese team appeared in such a ship, it's time for us to become pirates and steal the victory". Eventually, Greece beat the hosts and the team was described as Piratiko, meaning the 'Pirate ship', which emerged as the new nickname of the team repeated at every win during the tournament. Especially after Greece won in the final to Portugal, the new nickname was established to commemorate the coronation of Greece as European champions.

Rivalries 

Greece has a historical rivalry with Turkey; having played them a total of 13 matches, winning three, drawing three and losing seven games. Both countries have been described as "punching above their weight"; with Greece winning Euro 2004 despite being classified as underdogs prior to the competition, and Turkey followed-up their World Cup semi-final appearance in 2002 by advancing to the semi-finals of Euro 2008, where they were knocked out by Germany. The relationship with Turkey is very intense overall. It is fueled by a dispute between the two countries, the dispute over Cyprus, and several incidents occurring during matches between Turkish and Greece clubs, it has been described as one of the international football rivalries.

Greece has also a football rivalry with Romania, because it is the team that has been met the most times in their history (36 times). Greece has won 8 matches and Romania has won 18 matches (10 matches between them ended in draw).

Media coverage
Greece's qualifying matches and friendlies are currently televised by Nova Sports and Alpha TV, a trademark of Digea.

Results and fixtures

The following is a list of match results from the previous 12 months, as well as any future matches that have been scheduled.

For all past match results of the national team, see the team's results page.

2022

2023

Coaching staff

Coaching history
The following table lists all assigned football managers for the national team and their record since Greece's first international game in April 1929.

Updated 20 November 2022

[*] Greece sanctioned for fielding ineligible player (Apostolos Giannou) in the international friendly match played between Turkey and Greece on 17 November 2015. The match is declared to be lost by forfeit and awarded 3–0 in favor of Turkey.

Players

Current squad
The following players were called for the UEFA Euro 2024 qualifying match against Gibraltar on 24 March 2023 and the friendly match against Lithuania on 27 March 2023.

Caps and goals correct as of 20 November 2022, after the match against Hungary.

Recent call-ups
The following players have also been called up to the Greece squad within the last twelve months.
 

PRE

Notes
PRE = Preliminary squad/standby.

Player records

Players in bold are still active, at least at club level.

Most capped players

Top goalscorers

Captains
List of captaincy periods of the various captains throughout the years.

Competitive record

Competitive results
These are Greece's results in the major competitions that they have participated in. The results in the main tournaments have been listed directly in the total column.

Updated 27 September 2022

FIFA World Cup

*Draws include knockout matches decided on penalty kicks.

UEFA European Championship

*Draws include knockout matches decided on penalty kicks.

UEFA Nations League

*Draws include knockout matches decided on penalty kicks.

FIFA Confederations Cup

*Draws include knockout matches decided on penalty kicks.

Olympic Games

FIFA ranking history
Greece's history in the FIFA World Rankings. The table shows the position that Greece held in December of each year (and the current position as of 2021), as well as the highest and lowest positions annually.

 FIFA-ranking yearly averages for Greece

Head-to-head record
, after the match against .

The game against Great Britain's Olympic Team (1952) was recognised as an official game of the Greece National Team by the Hellenic Football Federation

Honours

Competitions 

 UEFA European Championship
  Champions (1): 2004
 Mediterranean Games
  Champions (2): 1951, 1991
 Mediterranean Cup
  Runners-up (1): 1950-53
 UEFA Nations League
 Promotion (1): 2022–23 UEFA Nations League C
Balkan Cup
  Runners-up (1): 1934–35
  Third place (3): 1929–31, 1935, 1936

Other 
 World Soccer (magazine) – Men's World Team of the Year
  Champions (1): 2004
 Laureus World Sports Award for Team of the Year
  Champions (1): 2005
 FIFA Confederations Cup FIFA Fair Play Trophy
  Champions (1): 2005
Unofficial Football World Championships
Matches won as Champions: 11

See also

List of Greece international footballers
Greece national under-23 football team (Greece Olympic team)
Greece national under-21 football team
Greece national under-20 football team
Greece national under-19 football team
Greece national under-17 football team

References

Further reading
 Αρβανίτης, Στάθης (2004). Εθνική Ελλάδος Ποδοσφαίρου 1929-2004 . Εκδόσεις Καστανιώτης. .
 Μαμουζέλος, Γιάννης Ν. & Νταβέλος, Θοδωρής (2007). 100 χρόνια Εθνική Ελλάδας . Αθήνα, Ελλάδα: Εκδόσεις Άγκυρα. .
 Φασούλας, Χρήστος & Κοντολέων, Δομήνικος (2008). Εθνική Ελλάδος γεια σου! . Εκδόσεις Παπαδόπουλος. .
 Σαμπράκος, Βασίλης (2018). Εξηγώντας το Θαύμα . Εκδόσεις Τόπος. .

External links

 Official website 
 Greece at FIFA
 Greece at UEFA
 greecechampion.com Greece Champions Euro 2004

Greece national football team
European national association football teams
National team
UEFA European Championship-winning countries
Laureus World Sports Awards winners
1920 establishments in Greece